The Cup and Saucer Stakes is a thoroughbred horse race held annually in October at Woodbine Racetrack in Toronto, Ontario, Canada. Open to two-year-old horses foaled in Canada, it is currently run at a distance of  miles on turf. Along with its dirt race counterpart, the Coronation Futurity Stakes, the Cup and Saucer Stakes is the richest race for two-year-olds foaled in Canada.

The race was first run on October 13, 1937 at Toronto's now-defunct Long Branch Racetrack. It was originally known as Mrs. Orpen's Cup and Saucer Handicap, named after the track owner Abe Orpen's wife. It held that name until 1947 when it was renamed the Orpen Cup and Saucer Handicap. It was changed to its current name in 1949.

The race was run from 1937 to 1952 on dirt at a distance of 1 mile 70 yards. World War II consolidations saw the race shifted to the Dufferin Park Racetrack from 1942 to 1945 before returning to Long Branch in 1946. In 1953, the racing distance was increased to  miles and remained at that distance after moving to the new Woodbine Racetrack in 1956. Converted to a turf race in 1959, the Cup and Saucer Stakes was raced at  miles from 1973 to 1982 but then reverted to its  miles in 1983.

The 1963 running was notable for who did not win as the future U.S. and Canadian Hall Of Famer Northern Dancer finished second. In the 1980s, Sam-Son Farm and their trainer James E. "Jim" Day came to dominate this event.

Records
Time record: (at the present distance of  miles)
 1:41.43 - Pyramid Park (2005)

Most wins by an owner:
 13 - Sam-Son Farm (1982, 1984, 1985, 1986, 1987, 1988, 1989, 1990, 1993, 1994, 1999, 2000, 2001)

Most wins by a jockey:
 5 - Patrick Husbands (2003, 2008, 2011, 2012, 2015)
 4 - Sandy Hawley (1970, 1974, 1978, 1989)

Most wins by a trainer:
 10 - James E. Day (1982, 1984, 1985, 1986, 1987, 1988, 1989, 1990, 1993, 1994)

Winners of the Cup and Saucer Stakes

Run in two divisions in 1950 and 1977. The second division in 1977 was won by Overskate but he was disqualified and set back to fourth.

References

External links
 The Cup and Saucer Stakes at Pedigree Query

Restricted stakes races in Canada
Flat horse races for two-year-olds
Turf races in Canada
Recurring events established in 1937
Woodbine Racetrack
Horse races in Ontario